Grace Around the World is a DVD and CD by Jeff Buckley compiling live, international performances from his album, Grace.  It was released in two packages. The Standard Edition includes a live DVD and an accompanying CD counterpart.  The Deluxe Edition (limited edition) includes a bonus DVD of the documentary, Amazing Grace: Jeff Buckley.

Track listing
Disc One DVD: Grace Around the World
"Grace" (BBC Late Show, London, 1/17/95)
"So Real" (Live aus dem Südbahnhof, Frankfurt, 2/24/95)
"Mojo Pin" (Live aus dem Südbahnhof, Frankfurt, 2/24/95)
"What Will You Say" (Live aus dem Südbahnhof, Frankfurt, 2/24/95)
"Hallelujah" (MTV Japan, Tokyo, 1/31/95)
"Dream Brother" (Howlin' Wolf, New Orleans, 12/2/94)
"Eternal Life" (MTV's Most Wanted, London, 3/3/95)
"Last Goodbye" (MTV's Most Wanted, London, 3/3/95)
"Lover, You Should've Come Over" (JBTV, Chicago, 11/8/94)
"Lilac Wine" (MTV Europe, Eurockéennes Festival, Belfort, 7/9/95)

Bonus features
"Grace" (MTV, 120 Minutes, New York City, 1/15/95)
"So Real" (MTV, 120 Minutes, New York, 1/15/95)
"Last Goodbye" (MTV, 120 Minutes, New York, 1/15/95)
"Vancouver" (MTV's Most Wanted, London, 3/3/95)
"Hallelujah" (music video)
"Star Tours" (VH1, Naked Café Behind The Scenes Piece, 1/9/95)
"Merri Cyr Bus Interview" (spring 1995)

Disc Two CD: Grace Around the World (Same performances as Disc One but audio only)
Disc Three DVD: Amazing Grace: Jeff Buckley (Deluxe Edition only)

Charts

Certifications

Personnel
Jeff Buckley – vocals, guitar
Michael Tighe – guitar
Mick Grondahl – bass guitar
Matt Johnson – drums

References

Jeff Buckley albums
2009 video albums